Discodoris aurila is a species of sea slug, a dorid nudibranch, shell-less marine gastropod mollusks in the family Discodorididae.

Distribution
This species occurs on the Pacific Ocean coasts of Mexico, Panama and Costa Rica.

Description 
Discodoris aurila is a flattened dorid which moulds itself to the surface it is resting on. It is light grey in colour with diffuse brown patches and irregular white markings. The gills and rhinophores have a pink tinge. The maximum recorded length is 50 mm.

References

Discodorididae
Gastropods described in 1967